Kolobki is a rural locality (a selo) in Ivolginsky District, Republic of Buryatia, Russia. The population was 300 as of 2010. There are 5 streets.

Geography 
Kolobki is located 15 km southeast of Ivolginsk (the district's administrative centre) by road. Solontsy is the nearest rural locality.

References 

Rural localities in Ivolginsky District